Lightspeed Venture Partners is an american venture capital firm focusing on multi-stage investments in the enterprise, consumer, and health sectors. Lightspeed invests in seed, early and growth-stage companies.

The company invests in the U.S. and abroad, with investment professionals and advisors in Silicon Valley, Israel, India, China, Europe, and Southeast Asia.  Lightspeed has ten offices globally.

History
The firm was founded in October 2000 when investors from Weiss, Peck & Greer left to start Lightspeed following the sale of the investment management business to Robeco. Jeremy Liew joined the firm in 2006 as its first consumer tech-focused partner. For the next decade, Lightspeed Venture Partners largely remained an enterprise software and infrastructure specialist, investing in: Nimble Storage, Nutanix, MuleSoft, and AppDynamics.

In 2012, Lightspeed became the first venture investor in Snap Inc., a year after Snapchat was launched. Snapchat raised $485,000 in its seed round and an undisclosed amount of bridge funding from Lightspeed Venture Partners in 2012. Beyond the two Snap founders, the two biggest shareholders for the planned early 2017 Snap IPO were Benchmark and Lightspeed Venture Partners, both prior Snap investors and venture-capital firms from Silicon Valley. They held a combined stake of about 20%.

In September 2020, Lightspeed Venture Partners launched its Southeast Asia operations with a new regional headquarters in Singapore.

In November 2021, The Wall Street Journal reported that Lightspeed Venture Partners is a major investor in Chinese semiconductor firms, raising U.S. national security concerns. Lightspeed China Partners closed its largest funding round at $920 million the same month.

Since 2000, Lightspeed Venture Partners has made significant investments, including: BlueNile, Flixster, Kosmix, Moveworks, Outschool, OYO Rooms, OverOps, Pixxel, Playdom, Ripple Labs, Rubrik, Snapchat, Solazyme,
TutorVista, Vector Space Systems, YugabyteDB, Fusion-io, Cameo, Calm, Goop, The Honest Company, Zola, MuleSoft, Nutanix, Nimble Storage, Grubhub, SolarEdge, Zscaler, Giphy, IEX., Terraform Labs (blockchain, which crashed), and BTCC.

Funding
In 2014, Lightspeed closed Lightspeed X, a $1 billion fund focused on the Enterprise, Consumer and Cleantech markets.  As of 2012, the firm had $3 billion in committed capital.

In March 2016, the company raised two new funds totaling in $1.2 billion.

In April 2020, Lightspeed Venture Partners raised $4.2 billion across three funds: $890 million for its latest early-stage venture fund, a $1.83 billion growth fund for later-stage investments, and a $1.5 billion opportunity fund for doubling down on winners in its international portfolio.

In 2022, Lightspeed raised $7.1 billion across four funds and also launched joint crypto and blockchain partnerships.

Lightspeed Scout Program

The Lightspeed Scout Program brings together entrepreneurs, future investors, and operators, to advance their skills and track record as early-stage investors. Lightspeed supports Scouts with capital, programming, and community. Scouts work with Lightspeed Partners and their fellow Scouts to invest in aspiring entrepreneurs in their network and build their personal investment strategy. The 2020 Lightspeed Scout Program brought together people from black, Latino, indigenous, and Pacific Islander communities to receive support and capital as they join the venture industry. The firm's aspiration is that the Scout Program's renewed focus and commitment to representation will inspire the future leaders of venture.

References

External links

 Lightspeed Venture Partners (Company website)
 Lightspeed Venture Partners Blog (Medium) (Company blog)

Financial services companies established in 2000
Companies based in Menlo Park, California
Venture capital firms of the United States